Simon Knox (born 14 October 1972) is a former Scotland international rugby league footballer who played in the 1990s and 2000s, and also coached.

Background
Simon Knox was born in Whitehaven, Cumberland, England.

Playing career
Simon Knox was transferred from amateur club Hensingham ARLFC to Carlisle in 1991. He spent four seasons at the club before joining Bradford Northern in 1995.

Knox won 3 caps (plus 1 as substitute) for Scotland in 1998–2003 while at Bradford Bulls and Swinton Lions.

References

External links
Knox takes on Under-21s role at Leigh
Statistics at rugby.widnes.tv

1972 births
Living people
Barrow Raiders players
Blackpool Panthers coaches
Bradford Bulls players
Carlisle RLFC players
English rugby league coaches
English rugby league players
Halifax R.L.F.C. players
Leigh Leopards players
Oldham R.L.F.C. players
Rugby league players from Whitehaven
Rugby league props
Rugby league second-rows
Salford Red Devils players
Scotland national rugby league team players
Swinton Lions players
Widnes Vikings players
Workington Town players